Marco Jhonnier Pérez Murillo (born September 18, 1990 is a Colombian footballer who plays as a striker for Categoría Primera A club Águilas Doradas.

Career
Pérez debuted for Boyacá Chicó in 2006 at the age of 17, and became a starter ahead more experienced strikers. He played the 2009–10 Argentine Primera División season on loan with Gimnasia y Esgrima La Plata, and helped the team avoid relegation from the first division. On 14 July 2010, Pérez signed a two-year loan deal with La Liga club Real Zaragoza. However, in July 2011 the Colombian forward left Zaragoza after poor performances, and returned to Argentina, joining Independiente. 

In January 2012, he joined Belgrano, but had a very poor spell, making 18 appearances without scoring a single goal. In July 2012, he joined Chilean club O'Higgins. In January 2013, he joined Independiente Medellín, leaving after the 2014 Apertura. He joined Deportes Tolima for the 2014 Finalizacion, and was part of the squad that won the 2018 Apertura title against Atlético Nacional. In 2020, he joined Deportivo Cali on a one year contract, and left when it expired in 2021.

Perez has been capped internationally with Colombia at the u-20 level, playing from 2006 to 2009.

Career statistics

International career
After a great first season with his club, Pérez won a place in the Colombia national under-20 football team that played the 2009 South American Youth Championship. After helping Boyacá Chicó F.C. lift the Copa Mustang, he received a call up to the full Colombia national football team.

Honours

Club
Boyacá Chicó
Categoría Primera A (1): 2008-I
Deportes Tolima
Categoría Primera A (1): 2018-I
Copa Colombia (1): 2014

References

1990 births
Living people
People from Quibdó
Colombian footballers
Colombia under-20 international footballers
Colombian expatriate footballers
Club de Gimnasia y Esgrima La Plata footballers
Boyacá Chicó F.C. footballers
Real Zaragoza players
Club Atlético Independiente footballers
Club Atlético Belgrano footballers
O'Higgins F.C. footballers
Deportes Tolima footballers
Independiente Medellín footballers
Al-Raed FC players
Chilean Primera División players
Argentine Primera División players
La Liga players
Categoría Primera A players
Saudi Professional League players
Expatriate footballers in Chile
Expatriate footballers in Argentina
Expatriate footballers in Spain
Expatriate footballers in Saudi Arabia
Colombian expatriate sportspeople in Chile
Colombian expatriate sportspeople in Argentina
Colombian expatriate sportspeople in Spain
Colombian expatriate sportspeople in Saudi Arabia
Association football forwards
Sportspeople from Chocó Department